William Norman Hartill (13 December 1911 – 3 March 1971) was an English first-class cricketer who played a single first-class match, for Worcestershire against Somerset in July 1935. His influence on the game was minimal : he was run out for 2 in his only innings, did not bowl and did not hold a catch.

Hartill was born in Dudley, which was then in Worcestershire; he died in Martley, also Worcestershire, aged 59.

External links
 

1911 births
1971 deaths
English cricketers
Worcestershire cricketers
Sportspeople from Dudley